Blaze Away is the ninth studio album by British band Morcheeba. It was released in June 2018 under Fly Agaric Records. It is the first Morcheeba album not to have involvement by Paul Godfrey, who left the band in 2014 after the release of the previous album Head Up High.

It is the second collaboration of Skye Edwards, the vocalist and lyricist, and Ross Godfrey, the producer and multi-instrumentalist, without the involvement of Paul Godfrey, the first having been the album Skye  Ross, having been produced under the project Skye & Ross.

Track listing

Charts

References

2018 albums
Morcheeba albums